Men of War: Condemned Heroes is a real-time tactics / strategy game set during World War II. It tells the story of Soviet penal battalions formed under Joseph Stalin's infamous Order 227.

Reception

Men of War: Condemned Heroes received a score of 57/100 on Metacritic from 12 reviews, indicating "mixed or average" reviews.

GameSpot gave the game a "mediocre" score of 5/10, criticizing the repetition of mission objectives and its overall difficulty.

References

External links

2012 video games
1C Company games
Cooperative video games
Real-time tactics video games
Windows games
Windows-only games
World War II video games
Multiplayer and single-player video games
Video games developed in Russia